David Sidney Riley (born 8 December 1960) is an English former footballer who played as a midfielder and striker, making 190 league appearances in a nine-year career in the Football League, scoring 40 goals.

He began his career at Nottingham Forest in 1983, and had loan spells at Darlington and Peterborough United, before joining Port Vale for £20,000 in October 1987. In March 1990 he was sold on to Peterborough United for £40,000, and helped the club to two successive promotions into the Second Division. He later played for Kettering Town, Ponsonby (in New Zealand), Boston United, and King's Lynn.

Career
Riley played for Keyworth United before turning professional with Brian Clough's Nottingham Forest in June 1983. He played 12 First Division games for the club between April 1984 and 1987, scoring two goals. He was loaned out to Darlington in February 1987, and played six Third Division games for Cyril Knowles' side, scoring two goals. He joined Fourth Division side Peterborough United on loan in 1987, and played twelve league games under Noel Cantwell, scoring two goals.

He joined Third Division club Port Vale in October 1987, manager John Rudge splashing out £20,000. He scored on his debut at Vale Park in a 2–1 win over Bristol Rovers on 19 October. He became the club's joint-top scorer in the 1987–88 season with 10 goals, along with Darren Beckford. He then switched to left-wing to cover for the injured Paul Atkinson. He played 48 league and cup games in the 1988–89 season, but broke his leg in a 1–1 draw at Bolton Wanderers on 25 April 1989, and so missed out on the play-off final victory over Bristol Rovers. He managed to recover, but did not re-capture his first team position and in March 1990 was loaned back to Peterborough United, who were then under Mark Lawrenson's stewardship; Peterborough paid £40,000 for his services on a permanent basis the next month.

He won promotion with the "Posh" in 1990–91, helping Chris Turner's side to the fourth and final promotion place in the Fourth Division. They then won a second successive promotion into the Second Division after beating Stockport County 2–1 in the play-off final at Wembley. Riley then joined Conference National club Kettering Town, and later played for F.C. Ponsonby in New Zealand, before returning to England with non-league sides Boston United and King's Lynn.

Style of play
Riley was a versatile midfielder and forward; at just  in heigh he was small and lacked pace, but was a hard working player.

Later life
By March 2011, he was working as under-15s manager at Peterborough United. He found work at Klassic Kitchens Company in nearby Yaxley.

Career statistics
Source:

Honours
Peterborough United
Football League Fourth Division fourth-place promotion: 1990–91
Football League Third Division play-offs: 1992

References

1960 births
Living people
Footballers from Northampton
English footballers
Association football midfielders
Association football forwards
Nottingham Forest F.C. players
Darlington F.C. players
Peterborough United F.C. players
Port Vale F.C. players
Kettering Town F.C. players
English expatriate footballers
Expatriate association footballers in New Zealand
Boston United F.C. players
King's Lynn F.C. players
English Football League players
National League (English football) players
Northern Premier League players
Association football coaches
Peterborough United F.C. non-playing staff